The Inner Circle Line was a steam era suburban railway line (later electrified) in Melbourne, Australia. It served the inner-northern suburbs of Parkville, Carlton North, Fitzroy North, and Fitzroy. At its closure, it ran from Royal Park station on the Upfield line in the west to a triangular junction with Rushall and Merri stations on today's Mernda line in the east. There was also a branch line to Fitzroy that opened at the same time.

History
The Inner Circle was opened on 8 May 1888 with three stations: North Carlton and North Fitzroy on the main line, and Fitzroy at the end of a short branch line leading south through the Edinburgh Gardens from a junction near North Fitzroy station.

As the main line
When the Inner Circle line first opened, services originated from Spencer Street station at the western end of the Melbourne central business district. Trains bound for the then terminus at Heidelberg station (now on the Hurstbridge line) would run to North Fitzroy station, then continue south to Victoria Park station (then known as Collingwood, and now on the Hurstbridge and Mernda lines). Locomotives would then have to change ends and the trains return to Clifton Hill station, where they diverged east on to the line to Heidelberg.

In December 1889, after the opening of the Whittlesea line, trains ran from Flinders Street to Whittlesea via the Inner Circle. Other services on the same route only travelled as far as Preston station.

A passenger service was originally provided from Spencer Street to Fitzroy station, on the branch line. By October 1889 this had been relegated to a short shuttle service from North Fitzroy station, and the passenger service closed altogether in May 1892.

For a short period between March and May 1891, the Inner and Outer Circle routes formed the only link between the eastern and western halves of the Victorian Railways system. Prior to that, the link was via a street-level tramway along the edge of the CBD between Flinders and Spencer Streets, which was generally only used at night. Between December 1888 and May 1891, when the new Flinders Street Viaduct, connecting Flinders Street and Spencer Street stations, was in its final stages of construction, the Outer and Inner Circle lines allowed freight trains to bypass the construction site.

Replaced by direct line
In 1901 a new direct line to Clifton Hill was opened from the central Princes Bridge station at the southern edge of the CBD through the inner eastern suburb of Abbotsford. This meant that Heidelberg-bound trains could run direct to their destination, removing the need for the reversal manoeuvre at Victoria Park. The Preston suburban service also ran via the new line. However, Whittlesea trains continued to use the more indirect route via the Inner Circle, albeit only from Spencer Street station.

With the loss of the main line services on the Inner Circle after 1901, a series of "roundabout" services were trialled. By 1906 a regular steam-operated service was established from Princes Bridge to North Fitzroy station via Clifton Hill, and by 1919 this service was running every hour off-peak.

Electrification of the line between Royal Park and Clifton Hill stations was commissioned on 31 July 1921, but the Fitzroy branch was not electrified. Following electrification, passenger services were extended to North Carlton running at 15 minute headways, but from 18 September 1921 they were changed to every 20 minutes. Two trains on weekdays, and a larger number at weekends were extended to Royal Park station to serve patrons of the Melbourne Zoo.

There was the possibility of a revitalisation of the Inner Circle in 1940, when the Ashworth Improvement Plan recommended a subway tunnel with five stations be built under the Melbourne CBD, from Flinders Street to the Inner Circle, with a proposed future subway from the first station to North Melbourne.

Traffic on the Inner Circle was discouraged by the circuitous route and by competition from the more direct trams to the city. Off-peak services were cut to every 30 minutes from 29 May 1944, but from 4 December 1944 20-minute headways were restored on Saturday and Sunday afternoons. The passenger service was finally cancelled on 3 July 1948, and North Carlton and North Fitzroy stations closed to passengers.

Freight only
After 1948 the Inner Circle line was used exclusively for freight trains serving sidings along the line itself, and the goods yard at the end of the Fitzroy branch. The overhead wiring for electric trains was dismantled in 1961. Only the main feeder cables needed for Epping (now Mernda) line trains, and for shunting at the Royal Park end, were retained. Significant changes occurred in 1965, when the line was singled and both legs of the triangle at the eastern end of the line were closed. This left just a single line from Royal Park to Fitzroy remaining for goods services. The line was officially closed on 31 July 1981.

Today
The rails were removed after the final closure, except for some short sections at former level crossings which can still be seen today. From Rushall to Royal Park stations the rail reserve has become a linear park which provides part of the Capital City Trail for cyclists, connecting the Merri Creek Trail to the Moonee Ponds Creek Trail in the network of shared use bicycle paths. Some signals and parts of level crossing gates also survive, with remaining overhead stanchions still carrying railway electric current between the Upfield and Mernda railway lines.

Of the three former stations, only North Carlton still stands, having been converted into a community centre. North Fitzroy station is now a slight rise in the walking and cycling path east of Nicholson Street. The path was realigned in 2002 to traverse the length of the former platform. The site of Fitzroy station has been redeveloped into a medium-density housing estate.

Line guide

See also
Outer Circle railway line

References

External links

 Fitzroy Railway Walk (Fitzroy Historical Society)
 City of Yarra: Inner Circle Railway Linear Park
 Victorian Railways signalling diagram: North Fitzroy to Merri in 1932
 Victorian Railways signalling diagram: Macaulay to North Fitzroy in 1913
 Victorian Railways signalling diagram: Macaulay to North Carlton in 1932
 1920 Morgan's Street Directory Map: Inner circle station locations

Closed Melbourne railway lines
5 ft 3 in gauge railways in Australia
Railway lines opened in 1888
Railway lines closed in 1981
1888 establishments in Australia
1981 disestablishments in Australia